Javier Méndez may refer to:

 Javier Méndez (baseball) (born 1964), Cuban baseball player
 Javier Méndez (Chilean footballer)
 Javier Méndez (footballer, born 1982), Uruguayan defender/midfielder
 Javier Méndez (footballer, born 1994), Uruguayan midfielder
 Javier Francisco Méndez (born 1972), Mexican boxer
 Javier Mendez (mixed martial arts trainer), Mexican mixed martial arts trainer